Billy Bowlegs III, Billy Fewell, aka Cofehapkee (1862–1965), was a Seminole elder, who was also of African-American descent.  He was a tribal historian in Florida.

Early life and education
According to an interview with Bowlegs, he was born on the Arbuckle Creek where it meets Lake Istokpoga. He was named Billie Fewell at birth, and was also known by his Seminole name, Cofehapkee.  He was the son of a Seminole father and a Black Seminole mother. His maternal grandmother, an African-American slave woman named Nagey Nancy, was taken captive by Seminole warriors during the Second Seminole War and adopted into the tribe. He was a member of the Snake Clan. His mother, Old Nancy, was killed in 1889, along with several other members of the Snake Clan, by his uncle, Jim Jumper, in the Jim Jumper massacre.

Bowlegs lived on the Brighton Seminole Indian Reservation after it was established, near Lake Okeechobee in present-day Glades County.

Career
As an adult, he renamed himself after Billy Bowlegs (Holata Micco), a prominent Seminole chief during the Seminole Wars.  A Black Indian, Bowlegs became an elder in the tribe.  He learned and taught much about its history.

Bowlegs befriended James Mallory and Minnie Moore Willson, who moved to Florida in the early 1880s.  They became advocates for the Seminole. The couple described him in their book, The Seminole of Florida, 1896.  He wanted to improve their understanding of the tribe's culture. The Willsons helped gain approval in 1913 by the Florida state legislature for a  reservation for the Seminole in the Everglades. They testified on the Seminole's behalf to the federal government in hearings in 1917. In the mid-1950s, he performed traditional dances at the Florida Folk Festival in Union County, on the Suwannee River.

Bowlegs was buried in Ortona Cemetery in Ortona, Florida.

Legacy and honors
A historical marker honors Billie Bowlegs III, also known as Chufi Hajo, near Moore Haven. It is located at the intersection of U.S. 27 and State Road 78. It was erected by the Polk County Historical Commission and the Seminole Tribe.

Notes

References

 Foreman, Ronald. First citizens and other Florida folks: essays on Florida folklife. Tallahassee: Bureau of Florida Folklife Programs, 1984.
note: Both the historical marker and the historical marker database record his name as Billie not Billy.

1862 births
1965 deaths
Native American leaders
Black Seminole people
American centenarians
Men centenarians
People from Glades County, Florida
African-American centenarians
Seminole Tribe of Florida people
20th-century African-American people
20th-century Native Americans